Parc station may refer to:

 Parc station (Montreal), a metro and commuter rail station in Montreal, Quebec, Canada
 Parc metro station (Brussels), a metro station in Brussels, Belgium
 Parc metro station (Charleroi), a metro station in Charleroi, Belgium

See also
Park station (disambiguation)